The Twombly was a cyclecar manufactured in the US by Driggs-Seabury between 1913 and 1915. The cars had water-cooled, four-cylinder engines, two seats in tandem, and an underslung body. Few of them are still in existence.

The designer was Willard Irving Twombly (1873-1953), inventor and aviator.  His largest investor, Reverend David Stuart Dodge petitioned for bankruptcy in 1915 claiming he was owed $428,238 by the Twombly group of companies for loans and interest.  Shortly after this, Twombly became involved in an expensive divorce case and was eventually jailed following accusations of bigamy and misconduct.

See also 
List of defunct United States automobile manufacturers
List of automobile manufacturers
List of car brands

References

External links
 http://restored-classics.com/bvac/aus2000rally2/page22.html

Cyclecars
Cars introduced in 1913
Defunct motor vehicle manufacturers of the United States
Vehicle manufacturing companies established in 1913
Vehicle manufacturing companies disestablished in 1915
1913 establishments in New York (state)
1915 disestablishments in New York (state)
Motor vehicle manufacturers based in New York (state)
American companies disestablished in 1915
American companies established in 1913